Bleeders (also known as Hemoglobin) is a 1997 Canadian horror film directed by Peter Svatek and based upon H. P. Lovecraft's story "The Lurking Fear". It premiered at the Fantastisk Film Festival Lund in Sweden on July 31, 1997, and was released direct to video the following year. It is the last original script written by Dan O'Bannon produced during his lifetime.

Plot
John and Kathleen Strauss are a French-Canadian couple attempting to uncover the secret to John's rare blood disease. They encounter Dr. Marlowe, who is intrigued by the case.  They are unaware that the Grand Manan Island in Canada's New Brunswick which they are about to set foot upon is home to the Van Dam family, mutant-like creatures who have become deformed and bloodthirsty from centuries of inbreeding.  Their mutation began with their relative Eva Van Dam, who had a incestuous relationship with her twin brother. Also, they are fully functioning hermaphrodites, capable of reproducing with themselves.  They need to survive on (dead or alive) human flesh.

John discovers that he is a Van Dam, born normal looking and taking part in normal society, but his rare blood disease can only be suppressed with human flesh and sex with his siblings.

Cast
 Roy Dupuis as John Strauss / Van Dam
 Gillian Ferrabee as Eva Van Dam  / John's Twin Sister
 Kristin Lehman as Kathleen Strauss
 Rutger Hauer as Dr. Marlowe
 Janine Theriault as Alice Gordon

Reception
HorrorNews.net panned the film overall, criticizing it for its "abundance of clichés" and commenting that they would "be damned if there was anything in this picture worth seeing again". Moria gave the film two stars and stated that "one can see that a number of sequences have been designed on paper in a way that could have had some shock impact had they been directed by someone with half an ounce of talent".

References

External links

1997 films
Canadian monster movies
English-language Canadian films
1990s English-language films
Films based on works by H. P. Lovecraft
Films based on short fiction
Films with screenplays by Dan O'Bannon
Incest in film
1997 horror films
Films with screenplays by Ronald Shusett
Films directed by Peter Svatek
1990s Canadian films